= Kajlas =

- village
- Location within Madhya Pradesh Location within India
- Coordinates: 23.2205735°N 77.2606305°E
- Country: India
- State: Madhya Pradesh
- District: Bhopal
- Tehsil: Huzur
- Elevation: 516 m (1,693 ft)

Population (2011)
  - Total: 675
- Time zone: UTC+5:30 (IST)
- ISO 3166 code: MP-IN
- 2011 census code: 482483

Kajlas is a village in the Bhopal district of Madhya Pradesh, India. It is located in the Huzur tehsil and the Phanda block.

== Demographics ==
According to the 2011 census of India, Kajlas has 107 households. The effective literacy rate (i.e. the literacy rate of population excluding children aged 6 and below) is 72.22%.

Demographics (2011 Census)
	Total	Male	Female
Population	675	346	329
Children aged below 6 years	135	73	62
Scheduled caste	25	12	13
Scheduled tribe	5	3	2
Literates	390	243	147
Workers (all)	207	173	34
Main workers (total)	150	142	8
Main workers: Cultivators	123	115	8
Main workers: Agricultural labourers	1	1	0
Main workers: Household industry workers	19	19	0
Main workers: Other	7	7	0
Marginal workers (total)	57	31	26
Marginal workers: Cultivators	0	0	0
Marginal workers: Agricultural labourers	57	31	26
Marginal workers: Household industry workers	0	0	0
Marginal workers: Others	0	0	0
Non-workers	468	173	295
